In the Germanic languages, weak verbs are by far the largest group of verbs, are therefore often regarded as the norm (the regular verbs).

Whereas the strong verbs are the oldest group of verbs in Germanic, originating in Indo-European, the weak verbs arose as an innovation in proto-Germanic. Originally the weak verbs consisted of new verbs coined from pre-existing nouns (for example the noun name was turned into the verb to name), or coined from strong verbs to express the sense of causing the action denoted by that strong verb (for example the strong verb to rise was turned into the weak verb to raise).

However, over time, the weak verbs have become the normal form of verbs in all Germanic languages, with most strong verbs being reassigned to the weak class. For example, in Old English the verb to lock was strong (present tense  'I lock', past tense  'I locked'), but has now become weak. This transition is ongoing. For example, the English verb to cleave currently exists in both a conservative strong form (past tense I clove) and an innovative weak form (past tense I cleaved).

General description
In all Germanic languages, the preterite and past participle forms of weak verbs are formed from the same stem:

In the English language, the dental is a  after a voiced consonant (loved) or vowel (laid), a  after a voiceless consonant (laughed), and  after the dentals/alveolars  and  themselves, but English uses the spelling in  regardless of pronunciation, with the exception of a few verbs with irregular spellings.

In Afrikaans, which descends from Dutch, the past tense has fallen out of use altogether, and the past participle is marked only with the prefix ge-. Therefore, the suffix has disappeared along with the forms that originally contained it.

In German the dental is always  and always spelled  because of the third phase of the High German consonant shift (d→t).

However the ending has fallen out in pronunciation, starting in the 17th century when the preterite was written with the ending -er representing the sound  which was already the last remnant of the former -de and -te endings of Middle Low German.

In Icelandic, the dental was originally a voiced dental fricative .

The situation of early Norwegian was similar to Icelandic, but intervocalic  eventually disappeared. It is spelled accordingly. In Nynorsk, it can be different in the preterite and the past participle.

Swedish has a similar situation to that of Norwegian, but the dental is retained in the spelling, even between vowels.

Classes of verbs
In Proto-Germanic, there were seven types of weak verbs, five of which were significant.  However, they are normally grouped into four classes, based on the conjugational system of Gothic.

Class I Verbs
Class I verbs actually consist of three classes in Proto-Germanic:

Class I, subclass (i)
A small class of verbs had no suffix in the present, and no suffix in the past (other than the -d- or -t- of all weak verbs).  This class had only three members:

*bringaną "to bring", past tense *branht-.  This verb was continued as such in all the descendants, although an alternate stem *brangij- occasionally appeared in some of the West Germanic languages (e.g. Old English ).
*brūkaną "to use", past tense *brūht-.  This verb tended to move into other classes.  For example, in Gothic this verb moved into subclass (ii) of Class I (brūkjan, past brūhta), whereas in Old English it became a Class II strong verb (past tense  ← ).
*būaną "to dwell", past tense *būd-.  This verb continued as such in most descendants but became a Class III weak verb bauan in Gothic.

Class I, subclass (ii)
A small class of verbs had the suffix -j- in the present and no suffix in the past.  This class had only five members in Proto-Germanic:

*bugjaną "to buy", past tense *buht-
*sōkijaną "to seek", past tense *sōht- (given a regularized subclass (iii) past sōkida in Gothic)
*þankijaną "to think", past tense *þanht-
*þunkijaną "to seem", past tense *þunht-
*wurkijaną "to work", past tense *wurht-

Verbs of this class were said to undergo rückumlaut ("reverse umlaut") in the past, since the umlaut occurring in the present (triggered by the -j-) is undone or "reversed" in the past (due to the lack of the umlaut-triggering stem -i- of subclass (iii)), leading to a non-umlauted vowel in the past.

These verbs also have consonant and vowel alternations between present and past that are due to regular sound changes but result in strikingly different forms in the historical Germanic languages (e.g. think, past tense thought).  Specifically:
There is an alternation between -k- or -g- in the present and -h- in the past, caused by the -t- of the past-tense suffix.  Prior to the operation of Grimm's Law, the stem consonant was -g- or -gʰ-.  Before -t- the consonant was devoiced to -k- by assimilation, and then became -h- by Grimm's Law.  This alternation is sometimes called Primärberührung.
-n- before -h- disappeared after nasalizing the previous vowel.  When the -n- disappeared, the vowel was lengthened by the process of compensatory lengthening.
-u- was lowered to -o- in the past tense due to a-mutation, since the following vowel was always non-high.

The class remained small in Gothic, but expanded significantly in the other languages:

In Old Norse, all short-stem verbs (those with a short vowel followed by at most one consonant or a long vowel followed by no consonant) appeared to move into this class, as indicated by the fact that no umlaut occurs in the past, as would be caused by a suffix -i-.  However, this may have been due to a regular sound change that eliminated unstressed nonfinal short vowels coming after a short stem before the operation of umlaut.
In Old High German, short-stem verbs ending in -zz (-tz), -pf, -ck (Proto-Germanic root ending in *-t, -p, -k), and optionally those in -ll, join this class.  For example, zellen "to tell" < *taljan, past tense zalta, zelita.  A number of long-stem verbs also join this class, e.g. brennen "to burn", past tense branta; wenten "to turn", past tense wanta.
In Old English and the other northern West Germanic languages, a number of verbs ending in -(c)c- and -ll- joined the class, e.g. in Old English:
 "to shake" < , past tense  < 
 "to afflict", past tense 
 "to seize" (based on earlier ?), past tense 
 "to moisten", past tense 
 "to reach" < , past tense  < 
 "to narrate", past tense 
 "to care for" (based on earlier ?), past tense 
 "to teach", past tense 
 "to stretch", past tense 
 "to cover", past tense 
 "to awake", past tense 
 "to kill" < , past tense  < 
 "to dwell", past tense 
 "to give, sell", past tense 
 "to place", past tense 
 "to tell", past tense 

In Late Old English, further verbs in -can were drawn into this class by analogy, but with umlaut maintained, e.g.  "to deceive", past tense , earlier , or  "to warm", past tense , earlier .  At the same time, verbs in -ccan were modified to follow the same pattern, e.g. new past tense  alongside earlier .

Class I, subclass (iii)
A large class of verbs had the suffix -j- in the present and -i- in the past: e.g. Gothic satjan "to set" (Old English ), sandjan "to send" (Old English ).  As shown in the Old English cognates:
The -j- produced umlaut of the stem vowel in languages other than Gothic.
The -j- caused West Germanic gemination in the West Germanic languages in short-stem verbs ending in a consonant other than -r.
The -j- resulted in palatalization of preceding velar consonants in Old English.
The -j- remained in Gothic and Old Saxon, but disappeared in the other languages: In long-stem verbs in Old Norse, and in all verbs except those in -r in the remaining West Germanic languages. (In Old High German, it deflected *-jan into *-jen before disappearing, leaving a suffix -en. This phenomenon, which resembles the usual umlaut of a in syllables preceding j, is nevertheless distinct and must have happened later, as the disappeared j also caused umlaut.)

This class was split into two subclasses in all the Old Germanic languages, one consisting of short-stem verbs and one of long-stem verbs.  The distinction between the two was originally due to Sievers' Law, and was extended due to changes such as West Germanic gemination, which affected short-stem but not long-stem verbs.  The West Germanic languages had a third subclass consisting of short-stem verbs ending in -r (e.g. Old English  "to plow",  "to save",  "to stir"), due to West Germanic gemination and subsequent loss of -j- not taking place.

The following is a cross-language paradigm of a short-stem Class I verb *gramjaną "to anger" (Gothic gramjan, Old Norse gremja, Old High German gremmen, Old Saxon *gremmian, Old English , Old Frisian *gremma).  Note that the Old Saxon and Old Frisian verbs given here are unattested, almost certainly due to the small nature of the respective corpora.

The following is a cross-language paradigm of a long-stem Class I verb *hauzijaną "to hear" (Gothic hausjan, Old Norse heyra, Old High German hōren, Old Saxon hōrian, Old English hīeran, Old Frisian hēra)

Class II Verbs
Class II verbs were formed with a suffix -ō-.  In the northern West Germanic languages, an alternative extended suffix -ōja- sometimes appears in the non-past forms, e.g. the Old English infinitive -ian < *-ōjan.

The following is a cross-language paradigm of *laþōną "to invite" (Gothic laþōn, Old Norse laða, Old High German ladōn, lathōn, Old Saxon lathian (-ōjan), ladian (-ōjan), Old English laþian, Old Frisian lathia).

Class III Verbs
What is known as "Class III" was actually two separate classes in Proto-Germanic:
A class of verbs with stative semantics (i.e. denoting a state rather than an action), formed with a present suffix that was either *-ai- or *-ja-, and no suffix in the past.
A class of verbs with factitive semantics (i.e. with the meaning "make X" where X is an adjective or noun, e.g. "renew, enslave"), formed with a suffix that was either *-ai- or *-ā-, and a suffix *-a- in the past.

The histories of this class in the various Germanic languages are quite varied:
Old High German combined both into a single class and generalized *-ai- (appearing as -ē- through regular sound change) to all forms of the present and past.
Gothic combined both into a single class, keeping the *-ai-/-ā- alternation of the factitives in the present, generalizing the alternation to the statives as well, and borrowing *-ai- as the past suffix.
Old Norse for the most part combined both into a single class in the same fashion as Gothic; however, two relic stative verbs (segja "to say" and þegja "to be silent") preserve the stative suffixes in both present and past, and a third verb (hafa "to have") is a mixture of the two, with factitive suffixes in the present indicative plural and imperative and stative suffixes in the present indicative singular and past participle (elsewhere, the two types have fallen together).
The other (i.e. northern) West Germanic languages have only small numbers of Class III verbs—but they consistently follow the stative paradigm, unlike the three languages above.

An example is the stative verb reconstructed as Proto-Germanic *habjaną "to have", past indicative third-person singular habdē:
Old English hebban < *habjan, past 3sg. hæfde — derived entirely through regular sound changes.
Old High German habēn, past 3sg. habēta — derived through analogical spread of suffix -ē-.
Gothic haban, past 3sg. habáida — derived through various analogical changes.
Old Norse hafa, past 3sg. hafði — partly regular, partly analogical.

Only four stative verbs survive as Class III verbs in the northern West Germanic languages (i.e. Old English, Old Saxon, Old Frisian and Old Low Franconian):
*sagjaną "to say"
*libjaną "to live"
*habjaną "to hold, have"
*hugjaną "to think"

However, there are five more verbs that appear as Class III verbs in Old High German, Gothic and/or Old Norse that also have remnants of the stative conjugation in one or more northern West Germanic languages:
*þagjaną "to be silent"
*siljaną "to be silent"
*þuljaną "to endure" (normally Class II þolian in Old English, but cf. archaic umlauted infinitive -þoelġe; Class III in Old Norse þola)
*fijaną "to hate"
*hatjaną "to hate" (normally Class II hatian in Old English, but cf. umlauted nominalized present participle hettend "enemy"; Class III in Gothic hatan)

Class IV Verbs
Class IV verbs were formed with a suffix -nan, e.g. Gothic fullnan "to become full".  The present tense was conjugated as a strong verb, e.g. Gothic fullna, fullnis, fullniþ, etc.  The past tense was conjugated with suffix -nō-, e.g. Gothic fullnōda, fullnōdēs, etc.  This class vanished in other Germanic languages; however, a significant number of cognate verbs appear as Class II verbs in Old Norse and as Class III verbs in Old High German.  This class has fientive semantics, i.e. "become X" where X is an adjective or a past participle of a verb.  Examples of deadjectival Class IV verbs in Gothic are ga-blindnan "to become blind" (blinds "blind"), ga-háilnan "to become whole" (háils "whole").  Examples of deverbal Class IV verbs in Gothic are fra-lusnan "to perish" (fra-liusan "to destroy"), ga-þaúrsnan "to dry up, wither away" (ga-þaírsan "to wither"), mikilnan "to be magnified" (mikiljan "to magnify"), us-háuhnan "to be exalted" (us-háuhjan "to exalt").  Note that the last two are deverbal even though the underlying root is adjectival, since they are formed to other verbs (which are in turn formed off of adjectives).  The vast majority of Class IV verbs appear to be deverbal.  Class IV verbs derived from weak verbs keep the same stem form as the underlying weak verb.  However, class IV verbs derived from strong verbs adopt the ablaut of the past participle, e.g. dis-skritnan "to be torn to pieces" (Class I dis-skreitan "to tear to pieces"), us-gutnan "to be poured out" (Class II giutan "to pour"), and-bundnan "to become unbound" (Class III and-bindan "to unbind"), dis-taúrnan "to be torn asunder, burst asunder" (Class IV dis-taíran "to tear asunder, burst"), ufar-hafnan "to be exalted" (Class VI ufar-hafjan "to exalt"), bi-auknan "to abound, become larger" (Class VII bi-aukan "to increase, add to").

Modern languages

In the modern languages, the various classes have mostly been leveled into a single productive class.  Icelandic, Norwegian and Frisian have retained two productive classes of weak verbs. (In Frisian, in addition to the class with -de, there is a class of je-verbs, where the dental suffix has dropped, i.e. -je < -iad.) Swiss German also has two types of weak verbs, descended from Class I and Classes II and III respectively of Old High German weak verbs and marked with -t and -et, respectively, in the past participle.

In the history of English, the following changes happened:

Most Class III verbs were moved into Class II prior to the historical period of Old English.
The remaining four Class III verbs moved into Class I or Class II late in Old English.
Throughout the Middle English period, Class I verbs gradually moved into Class II.

In Modern English, only one productive weak paradigm remains, derived from Class II.  A number of Class I verbs still persist, e.g.:

From Old English subclass (i): bring (brought)
From Old English subclass (ii) or analogously: buy (bought); catch (caught); seek (sought); sell (sold); teach (taught); tell (told); think (thought); work (wrought) [obsolescent]
From Old English subclass (iii) or analogously: bend (bent); bet (bet); breed (bred); build (built); cast (cast); cost (cost); creep (crept); cut (cut); deal (dealt); dream (dreamt); feed (fed); flee (fled); hear (heard); hit (hit); hurt (hurt); keep (kept); kneel (knelt); knit (knit); lay (laid); lead (led); leap (leapt); leave (left); lend (lent); light (lit); lose (lost); mean (meant); meet (met); put (put); read (read); rend (rent) [obsolescent]; send (sent); set (set); shed (shed); shoot (shot); shut (shut); sleep (slept); speed (sped); spend (spent); spill (spilt); split (split); spread (spread); sweep (swept); thrust (thrust); wed (wed); weep (wept); as well as a few others
From Old English Class III verbs: have (had); say (said)

As the previous list shows, although there is only one productive class of weak verbs, there are plenty of "irregular" weak verbs that don't follow the paradigm of this class.  Furthermore, the regular paradigm in English is not unitary, but in fact is divided into subclasses in both the written and spoken language, although in different ways:
In the written language, before the past-tense suffix -ed, short-stem verbs double the final consonant (e.g. dip (dipped)), while a -y following a consonant becomes -i (e.g. carry (carried)).
In the spoken language, the past-tense suffix -ed is variously pronounced , or  depending on the preceding consonant.

Both of these characteristics occur in a similar fashion in most or all the modern Germanic languages.  In modern German, for example, descendants of the original subclass (ii) of Class I are still irregular (e.g. denken (dachte) "to think", brennen (brannte) "to burn"), and subclasses of the productive verb paradigm are formed by verbs ending in -eln or -ern and in -ten or -den, among others.

Modern paradigms

One of the regular weak verb conjugations is as follows.

West Germanic

1. The distinction between the infinitive and present forms of Afrikaans verbs has been lost with the exception of a very few such as wees and is, "to be" and "is/am/are"
2. learn, teach

North Germanic

3. prepare, manufacture

Weak and strong verbs

Weak verbs should be contrasted with strong verbs, which form their past tenses by means of ablaut (vowel gradation: sing - sang - sung). Most verbs in the early stages of the Germanic languages were strong. However, as the ablaut system is no longer productive except in rare cases of analogy, almost all new verbs in Germanic languages are weak, and the majority of the original strong verbs have become weak by analogy.

Strong to weak transformations
As an example of the rather common process of originally strong verbs becoming weak, we may consider the development from the Old English strong verb scūfan to modern English shove:
 scūfan scēaf scofen (strong class 2)
 shove shoved shoved
Many hundreds of weak verbs in contemporary English go back to Old English strong verbs.

In some cases, a verb has become weak in the preterite but not in the participle and may be thought of as "semi-strong" (not a technical term). Dutch has a number of examples:
wassen waste gewassen ("to wash")
lachen lachte gelachen ("to laugh")

An example in English is:
sow sowed sown (strong class 7 with weak preterite)

Often, the old strong participle may survive as an adjective long after it has been replaced with a weak form in verbal constructions. The English adjective molten is an old strong participle of melt, which is now a purely weak verb with the participle melted. The participle gebacken of the German verb backen (to bake), is gradually being replaced by gebackt, but the adjective is always gebacken (baked).

Weak to strong transformations
The reverse process is very rare and can also be partial, producing "semi-strong" verbs:
show showed shown (originally weak verb with participle modelled on sown)

Weak verbs which develop strong forms are often unstable. A typical example is German fragen (to ask), which is historically weak and still weak in Standard German, but for a time in the 18th century, the forms fragen frug gefragen by analogy with for example tragen (to carry) were also considered acceptable in the standard. They survive today (along with a present tense frägt) in the Rhinelandic regiolect and underlying dialects. In Dutch, the new strong past vroeg of the cognate vragen is standard today, but its past participle is weak gevraagd (though some dialects do have gevrogen).

Origins
The weak conjugation of verbs is an innovation of Proto-Germanic (unlike the older strong verbs, the basis of which goes back to Proto-Indo-European). While primary verbs (those inherited from PIE) already had an ablaut-based perfect form that was the basis of the Germanic strong preterite, secondary verbs (those derived from other forms after the break-up of PIE) had to form a preterite otherwise, which necessitated the creation of the weak conjugation.

Denominative derivation
The vast majority of weak verbs are secondary, or derived. The two main types of derived verbs were denominative and deverbative. A denominative verb is one which has been created out of a noun. The denominative in Indo-European and early Germanic was formed by adding an ablauting thematic *-y- suffix to a noun or adjective.  This created verbs such as Gothic namnjan 'to name'.

Causative verbs
A significant subclass of Class I weak verbs are (deverbal) causative verbs. They are formed in a way that reflects a direct inheritance from the PIE causative class of verbs. PIE causatives were formed by adding an accented affix -éy- to the o-grade of a non-derived verb.  In Proto-Germanic,  causatives are formed by adding a suffix -j/ij- (the reflex of PIE -éy-) to the past-tense ablaut (mostly with the reflex of PIE o-grade) of a strong verb (the reflex of PIE non-derived verbs), with Verner's Law voicing applied (the reflex of the PIE accent on the -éy- suffix):

*bītaną (I) "to bite" → *baitijaną "to bridle, yoke, restrain", i.e. "to make bite down"
*rīsaną (I) "to rise" → *raizijaną "to raise", i.e. "to cause to rise"
*beuganą (II) "to bend" → *baugijaną "to bend (transitive)"
*brinnaną (III) "to burn" → *brannijaną "to burn (transitive)"
*frawerþaną (III) "to perish" → *frawardijaną "to destroy", i.e. "to cause to perish"
*nesaną (V) "to survive" → *nazjaną "to save", i.e. "to cause to survive"
*ligjaną (V) "to lie down" → *lagjaną "to lay", i.e. "to cause to lie down"
*sitjaną (V) "to sit" → *satjaną "to set, seat", i.e. "to cause to sit"
*faraną (VI) "to travel, go"  → *fōrijaną "to lead, bring", i.e. "to cause to go"
*faraną (VI) "to travel, go"  → *farjaną "to carry across", i.e. "to cause to travel" (an archaic instance of the o-grade ablaut used despite the differing past-tense ablaut)
*grētaną (VII) "to weep" → *grōtijaną "to cause to weep"
*lais (I, preterite-present) "(s)he knows"  → *laizijaną "to teach", i.e. "to cause to know"

Essentially, all verbs formed this way were conjugated as Class I weak verbs.

That method of forming causative verbs is no longer productive in the modern Germanic languages, but many relics remain. For example, the original strong verb fall fell fallen has a related weak verb fell felled felled, which means "to cause (a tree) to fall"; strong sit sat sat and lie lay lain are matched with weak set set set and lay laid laid, meaning "to cause something to sit" or "lie" respectively. In some cases, phonological or semantic developments make the pairs difficult to recognise. For example, rear is the regular phonological development of Proto-Germanic *raizijaną given in the above list, but the connection between rise and rear is no longer obvious. (One might guess that the counterpart of rise would be raise, but raise is a borrowing from Old Norse, *raizijaną continues regularly.) As another example, drench was originally the causative of drink, but the modern meaning of "drench" ("to cause to get wet") is no longer similar to "cause to drink". Similarly, German strong leiden litt gelitten ("to suffer") has the derived weak verb leiten ("to lead"), which makes sense when one realises that leiden originally meant "walk, go" and came to its present meaning through the idea of "undergoing" suffering.

Other types
There are primary verbs that date to Indo-European that took a weak conjugation because they were unable to take a perfect, including verbs that had zero grade of the root in the present and so were unable to show the ablaut distinction necessary for a strong preterite. That was the case with the verbs waurkjan 'to work, create', bugjan 'to buy', and sokjan 'to seek' (Gothic forms).

Preterite-present verbs are primary verbs in which the PIE present was lost, and the perfect was given a present meaning. They needed a new past tense, which followed the weak pattern.

The very most borrowings from other languages into Germanic were weak. (Not so  ‘to write’ from Latin .)

Origin of dental suffix
The origin of the dental suffix is uncertain. Perhaps the most commonly held theory is that it evolved out of a periphrastic construction with the verb to do: Germanic *lubō-dē- ("love-did") > *lubōdē- > Old English lufode > loved or *salbō-dē- ("salve-did", i.e., "put salve") > *salbōdē- > Old English sealfode > salved. That would be analogous to the way that in Modern English one can form an emphatic past tense with "did": I did love, I did salve.

The common PIE root *dʰeh₁- meaning 'do' was a root aorist and so did not take a perfect. However, it took a reduplicating present. The imperfect of the root is probably the origin of the dental suffix.

That view is not without objections:
 Germanic has long -ē- in the plural, which cannot directly reflect the Proto-Indo-European situation.
 Reduplication is only in the Gothic plural, not in the singular.

The objections are sometimes answered as follows:
 There might have been a refashioning according to cases like gēbun, viz. *gegbun > gēbun : *dedun → dēdun.
 Reduplication only in the plural can easily be explained by haplology in Proto-Germanic (*dede- being reduced to *de-) for the singular, with a later development of haplology for the plural in non-East Germanic languages.

Another theory is that it came from a past participle ending, a final *-daz from PIE *-tos (cf Latin amatus), with personal endings added to it at a later stage. That theory, however, is also disputed because of its inability to explain all the facts.

According to Hill (2010), the endings, which in the singular do not show reduplication in any Germanic language, continue the PIE subjunctive of the root aorist.

Other meanings
The term "weak verb" was originally coined by Jacob Grimm, who only applied it to Germanic philology. However, the term is sometimes applied to other language groups to designate phenomena that are not really analogous. For example, Hebrew irregular verbs are sometimes called weak verbs because one of their radicals is weak. See weak inflection.

Notes

References
 
 
 
 
 
 
 
 
 
 
 
 
 
 

Verb types
Indo-European verbs
Indo-European linguistics
Germanic language histories
German grammar
English grammar
Linguistic morphology
Germanic languages

fr:Conjugaison de l'allemand#Les verbes faibles